Ferdinand Ries composed the Symphony No. 5 in D minor, Op. 112, in London in 1813. It was the second symphony Ries wrote. It was first performed at a Philharmonic Society concert on 14 February 1814. In 1823, Breitkopf & Härtel published the work together with piano solo, piano duet and chamber arrangements.

Scored for flute, 2 oboes, 2 bassoons, 2 horns, 2 trumpets, 3 trombones, timpani and strings, the piece is in four movements:

 Allegro
 Larghetto con moto quasi andante
 Allegro assai
 Allegro

Inspired by Ludwig van Beethoven's Symphony No. 5 in C minor, Ries's Fifth uses the rhythm of Beethoven's famous "Fate" motif with different pitches. The piece has been recorded by the Zurich Chamber Orchestra conducted by Howard Griffiths on the Classic Produktion Osnabrück label.

References

Cecil Hill, "Ferdinand Ries", in The Symphony: Ferdinand Ries. London: Garland Publishing (1982)

External links

05
Ries 05
 1812 compositions
 Compositions in D minor